Kibblesworth is a village  west of Birtley, Tyne and Wear, England.  Kibblesworth was a mainly rural community until the development of the pit and brickworks and the resulting increase in population. Following the closure of the pit in 1974, few of the residents now work in the village. Historically in County Durham, it was transferred into the newly created county of Tyne and Wear in 1974.

After being predominantly a council estate project consisting of prefabricated homes built in the 1950s, Kibblesworth has seen a massive change in recent times with the 'pre-fabs' being demolished and the new homes built by Keepmoat replacing them all, providing a much needed facelift and more providing more homes to buy.

There are plans to build around 220 new homes by Taylor Wimpey on the surrounding outskirts of the village, with previous green belt land being downgraded to brown belt by the Government, with planning permission at an advanced stage, although this has had some strong opposition from current Kibblesworth residents due to already strained amenities including the local school and road systems.

Kibblesworth has a number of amenities: two play parks; a bowling green; a cricket and football pitch; the Kibblesworth Academy school; a working men's club; a local pub, The Plough Inn; a community centre, the Millennium Centre, opened by Princess Anne in 2000, which also features a hair salon and a beauty 'pod'; a convenience store, including the local post office run by the Thandi family; and an Italian bistro, Giuseppe's opened in 2019.

It is served by buses from Gateshead, Newcastle upon Tyne and Chester-le-Street, featuring three bus stops within the village and a scholars bus for the nearby Lord Lawson of Beamish, based in Birtley.

The village's name means "Cybbel's Enclosure".

Churches and chapels
Kibblesworth is in the parish of St. Andrews, Lamesley. While the area was agricultural, this was the centre of worship for the people of Kibblesworth. After the development of the mining industry, the Primitive Methodist Chapel (1869) and Wesleyan Methodist Chapel (1868), provided social as well as religious life for the village. The present chapel was built by the Wesleyan Methodists in 1913. The Primitive Methodist Chapel has now been converted into flats.

The colliery
Although there had been coal-mining in the Kibblesworth area from medieval times, relatively few men were employed in the industry until the sinking of Robert Pit in 1842. From this date the fortunes of the village followed those of the industry with particular black spots during the strikes of 1921 and 1926 and the depression of the 1930s, high spots in the boom of the 1950s and 60s, and eventually closure of the pit in 1974.

The Bowes Railway was used for the transport of coal from Kibblesworth to the River Tyne at Jarrow. The line was started by George Stephenson in 1826 and extended to Kibblesworth when Robert Pit was sunk in 1842. The railway used three types of power – locomotives, stationary steam engines and self-acting inclines. There is now a cycletrack that runs along the former track bed.

Notable buildings and structures
The square at Spout Burn was built to house the miners of Robert Pit. It was demolished between 1965 and 1966, and replaced by old people's bungalows the following year and the Grange Estate from 1973.

Better known as 'the Barracks', Kibbleswoth nether Hall was divided up into tenements for miners and there families no soldiers ever lived there. The memory survives, in the street named Barrack Terrace. The hall was demolished and replaced by the Miner's Institute in 1934. The areanearby site of kibblesworth old hall has recently been redeveloped for housing woodlands court.

In 1855 a short test tunnel for the London Underground was built in Kibbleworth, because it had geological properties similar to London. This test tunnel was used for two years in the development of the first underground train; in 1861 it was filled in.

Kibblesworthold Hall was for many years the home of the colliery manager. It was demolished in 1973.

The original Kibblesworth School was built in 1875, and closed in 1972. It has since been redeveloped using Lottery funding to house the village community centre known as the 'Millennium Centre'. The present school opened in 1972.

Chronology
1842 – The sinking of Robert Pit
1842–50 – Square and Barrack Terrace built; Old Hall (Barracks) converted to tenements
1855 – Metropolitan Railway dug a small tunnel to test digging skills before moving onto London
1862 – Causey Row built
1864 – Opening of Primitive Methodist Chapel
1867 – Opening of Wesleyan Methodist Chapel
1875 – Opening of school
1901 – School extensions built, Coronation Terrace built
1908–  Old Plough Inn demolished
1913 – Opening of New Wesleyan Chapel
1914 – The Crescent built and Grange Drift opened
1921 – Miners' strike
1922 – First aged miners' homes, opposite Liddle Terrace
1926 – General Strike
1932 – Closure of Grange Drift
1934 – Barracks demolished and Miners' Welfare Institute built on site
1936 – First council housing in Ashvale Avenue and Laburnum Crescent
1947 – Nationalisation of the pits
1965 – Square demolished
1974 – Closure of the pit

Notable people 
Si King, co-presenter of BBC television food programme Hairy Bikers, is from Kibblesworth.

References

External links

Villages in Tyne and Wear